SNARC (Stochastic Neural Analog Reinforcement Calculator) is a neural net machine designed by Marvin Lee Minsky. Prompted by a letter from Minsky, George Armitage Miller gathered the funding for the project from the Air Force Office of Scientific Research in the summer of 1951 with the work to be carried out by Minsky, who was then a graduate student in mathematics at Princeton University. At the time, a physics graduate student at Princeton, Dean S. Edmonds, volunteered that he was good with electronics and therefore Minsky brought him onto the project.

The machine itself is a randomly connected network of approximately 40 Hebb synapses. These synapses each have a memory that holds the probability that signal comes in one input and another signal will come out of the output. There is a probability knob that goes from 0 to 1 that shows this probability of the signals propagating. If the probability signal gets through, a capacitor remembers this function and engages a "clutch". At this point, the operator will press a button to give reward to the machine. At this point, a large motor starts and there is a chain that goes to all 40 synapse machines, checking if the clutch is engaged or not. As the capacitor can only "remember" for a certain amount of time, the chain only catches the most recent updates of the probabilities.

This machine is considered one of the first pioneering attempts at the field of artificial intelligence. Minsky went on to be a founding member of MIT's Project MAC, which split to become the MIT Laboratory for Computer Science and the MIT Artificial Intelligence Lab, and is now the MIT Computer Science and Artificial Intelligence Laboratory. In 1985 Minsky became a founding member of the MIT Media Laboratory.

References 
Citations

Works cited

Further reading

External links
 CyberneticZoo1053 http://cyberneticzoo.com/?p=1053
 Minsky interview videos on SNARC: part 1, 2

History of artificial intelligence
Artificial neural networks